The 2019 Nigerian House of Representatives election was held in all 360 constituencies where voters elected members of the House of Representatives using first-past-the-post voting. Most elections were held on February 23, 2019 with some elections running into February 24 while others had supplementary or rerun elections that took place at a later date. The last regular House elections for all districts were in 2015.

The All Progressives Congress solidified its majority after nearly losing it to defections in 2018. The APC gained a net total of 21 seats compared to the pre-election situation. On the other hand, the main opposition Peoples Democratic Party lost a net total of 26 seats compared to the pre-election situation while minor parties dropped six seats collectively, with All Progressives Grand Alliance (9 seats) and the African Democratic Congress (3 seats) emerging the largest two minor parties.

Upon the opening of the 9th Nigeria National Assembly, Femi Gbajabiamila (APC-Surulere I) was elected as Speaker of the House of Representatives while Ahmed Idris Wase (APC-Wase) and Alhassan Doguwa (APC-Tudun Wada/Doguwa) became Deputy House Speaker and House Majority Leader, respectively. Gbajabiamila named Ndudi Elumelu (PDP-Aniocha/Oshimili) House Minority Leader despite the PDP having nominated Kingsley Chinda (PDP-Obio/Akpor); Elumelu and the other PDP members named by Gbajabiamila as minority leadership were suspended from the PDP and it was not until February 2021 when the suspensions were lifted and party crisis ended.

Results summary and analysis 
Before the 2019 general election, dozens of lawmakers had defected from their original parties leading to a vastly different House compared to swearing-in day in 2015 as the APC barely held onto its legislative majority due to waves of defections. In the results, dozens more lawmakers lost in party primaries or in the general election with notable general election seat flips included several in Kwara State where the Ó Tó Gẹ́ Movement against the Saraki dynasty and the state PDP swept out five all PDP-held seats. In more perceived rebukes of political godfatherism and party switching, the House members that followed Akwa Ibom North-West Senator Godswill Akpabio into the APC all lost while most Kano House members that defected to the PDP along with outgoing Kano Central Senator Rabiu Kwankwaso also lost their seats. Other major stories were rapper Banky W. (MDP) losing in Eti-Osa but winning two polling units and pulling nearly 14%, Speaker Yakubu Dogara (PDP-Bogoro/Dass/Tafawa Balewa) winning re-election in his constituency as Senate President and fellow APC-to-PDP defector Bukola Saraki lost his senatorial district, the closeness of longtime House member and Minority Leader Ogor Okuweh's re-election in his Isoko South/Isoko North constituency, and the several seats won by APGA across the Southeast.

As is common after Nigerian elections, a swarm of ligation followed the House races with court and tribunal decisions changing results about two dozen constituencies along with thirteen rulings voiding elections and calling reruns in 2020 along with even more supplementary elections for areas with irregularities or technical problems on election day.

Abia State

Adamawa State

Akwa Ibom State

Anambra State

Bauchi State

Bayelsa State

Benue State

Borno State

Cross River State

Delta State

Ebonyi State

Edo State

Ekiti State

Enugu State

Federal Capital Territory

Gombe State

Imo State

Jigawa State

Kaduna State

Kano State

Katsina State

Kebbi State

Kogi State

Kwara State

Lagos State

Nasarawa State

Niger State

Ogun State

Ondo State

Osun State

Oyo State

Plateau State

Rivers State

Sokoto State

Taraba State

Yobe State

Zamfara State

Notes

References 

House
 
February 2019 events in Nigeria
2019